James Turkiewicz (born April 13, 1955) is a Canadian former professional ice hockey player.

Turkiewicz played 392 games in the World Hockey Association.  He played for the Toronto Toros and Birmingham Bulls.

Career statistics

External links

1955 births
Living people
Atlantic Coast Hockey League players
Birmingham Bulls players
Birmingham South Stars players
Canadian ice hockey defencemen
Canadian people of Polish descent
Ice hockey people from Ontario
Sportspeople from Hamilton, Ontario
Montreal Canadiens draft picks
Peterborough Petes (ice hockey) players
Rochester Americans players
Springfield Indians players
Toronto Toros draft picks
Toronto Toros players
World Hockey Association first round draft picks